This is a list of films which have placed number one at the weekend box office in the United States during 1989.

Number-one films

Highest-grossing films

Calendar gross
Highest-grossing films of 1989 for tickets sold within the calendar year

In-Year Release

See also
 List of American films — American films by year
 Lists of box office number-one films

References

Chronology

1989
United States
1989 in American cinema
1989-related lists